Covington Catholic High School (abbreviated CCH or CovCath) is a private, Roman Catholic, high school for boys in Park Hills, Kentucky, United States. It was founded in 1925 by Bishop Francis William Howard and Brother George Sauer, and is part of the Roman Catholic Diocese of Covington. The school is the only boys' high school in northern Kentucky and one of five in the Cincinnati area. The girls' Notre Dame Academy is located across the street.

History

Early history 
Covington Catholic traces its roots to St. Joseph Commercial School in Covington. In 1885, Bishop Camillus Paul Maes invited three brothers of the Society of Mary of Dayton, Ohio, to run the all-boys parochial school at St. Joseph's Parish on 12th Street. The brothers later established the commercial school to offer vocational education in business. The school graduated classes from 1892 to 1926.

In 1925, responding to Bishop Francis William Howard's call for a four-year Catholic boy's high school in Northern Kentucky, the Marianists opened Covington Catholic High School at Mother of God on West 6th Street, with a freshman class of 32. The commercial school closed the following year as the brothers chose to devote their efforts to the new high school. High school classes were held in the Mother of God School building until a new building could be completed. Covington Catholic graduated its first class of 17 in 1929. The school received accreditation from the Southern Association of Colleges and Schools and the Kentucky Department of Education that year. In its early years, the school's support and students came primarily from parishes in Covington, Fort Mitchell, Fort Wright, and Ludlow.

Relocation to Park Hills 
In the early 1950s, it became apparent that Covington Catholic High School would have to be expanded further to accommodate increased demand. The cornerstone was placed in 1954, and the first class graduated from the school in 1955. The 13 parishes shared the cost of the new school, around $845,000 (equivalent to $ in ).

The school gymnasium was dedicated on January 29, 1955, when the Purcell High School Cavaliers played Covington Catholic in basketball. Some Kenton County families sent their children to Newport Catholic High School because Covington Catholic lacked a football program. In 1968, the school added a football team that initially practiced at the Ludlow landfill. Wooten Field was later added for football, and the baseball field was completely rebuilt. A building containing a weight room, locker rooms, showers, and offices was added in 1988 to accommodate the growing needs of athletic teams.

Covington Catholic's athletic program benefited from a 1979 Ohio High School Athletic Association rule, affirmed in Alerding v. OHSAA, that barred Kentucky residents from participating in Ohio high school athletic competitions. Parents began sending their children to Covington Catholic instead of nationally renowned Moeller High School in Cincinnati.

Project Team Build 
In 1968, Covington Catholic introduced Project Team Build in response to the financial and staffing challenges that parochial schools were experiencing. The program consisted of modular scheduling, team teaching, independent study, and grading based on self-assessments, with increased participation by parents. Religious education became self-directed with an emphasis on elective courses. An "open campus" policy permitted students to leave the campus when not attending a class.

The school was accredited by the Kentucky Department of Education as an experimental school and won recognition for educational innovation. However, the governing Board of Pastors objected to the open campus policy and religion curriculum. In April 1971, after failed negotiations with the 12-member board, 30 of 46 faculty members resigned, including the principal, Fr. Richard K. Knuge. The Society of Mary permanently withdrew from the school. Kenneth J. Gross became the first lay principal that year, and the board was reorganized to include parents and laypeople. The open campus policy remained but was limited to seniors in good standing.

Expansion 
On October 29, 2002, construction of the current building began directly behind the original structure. It opened on December 7, 2003, and contains four computer labs. Since the new school has been built, renovations have been made to the football field, baseball complex, and gymnasium. Wooten Field was converted to synthetic turf with markings for American football and soccer. In October 2003, Covington Catholic became the first high school in the Cincinnati area to ban tailgate parties at on-campus sporting events.

Covington Catholic began a $ capital campaign to renovate and expand the school's other facilities. As part of phase 1, the Yung Family Tennis Complex opened in early 2016 and a new academic building opened soon after. In August 2017, the school opened a renovated Wooten Field at Dennis Griffin Stadium. The $ project upgraded the field, stands, and press box and added floodlights for night games. A new building opened in 2018 to house the school's STEM program and a 200-seat auditorium for drama and music classes. A south campus building will include a new cafeteria and alumni center. Phase 2 will renovate the existing gymnasium and build a separate multipurpose gymnasium.

The campus comprises . The gymnasium is the only building remaining from when the school moved to Park Hills.

Academics 

Students applying to Covington Catholic are required to take the Scholastic Testing Service's High School Placement Test (HSPT).

In 2015, Covington Catholic partnered with Project Lead the Way to introduce a STEM program. , a quarter of enrolled students take classes in this program.

The U.S. Department of Education recognized Covington Catholic as a National Blue Ribbon School for the 2007–08 and 2016–17 school years.

Extracurricular activities

Athletics 
Covington Catholic athletic teams are known as the Colonels, and the student cheering section is known as the Colonel Crazies. , the Colonels have won 21 Kentucky High School Athletic Association championships. From 1987 to 2015, under athletic director Mike Guidugli, the Colonels won 10 state championships, 21 state runner-up titles, and 130 regional titles. , two-thirds of the student body participates in KHSAA-sanctioned sports.

Since its football debut in 1968, the Colonels have been one of three dominant high school football teams in Northern Kentucky, along with Beechwood and Highlands. The Colonels have won seven state championships at the KHSAA Commonwealth Gridiron Bowl, the eighth most in the state. Originally, Covington Catholic was placed in Class 3A for postseason competition; it won the state championship in this class in 1987, 1988, 1993, 1994, 1997, and 2006. The school's District 5 competitors are Boone County, Conner, Cooper, and Highlands. The Colonels play home games on the school grounds, at Wooten Field at Dennis Griffin Stadium.

The baseball team plays home games at Tom Berger Field. The team won the state championship in 2002.

The swimming and diving teams practice at Silverlake Recreation Center in Erlanger and at Northern Kentucky University. Covington Catholic has won five state championships, in 1962 (in class B), 1974 (tied with Ft. Thomas Highlands in class AA), 1977 and 1978 (in class AA), and 1983.

Covington Catholic fielded its first soccer team in 1977. It won its first state championship in 2015.

The Colonels have also won two KHSAA championship titles in basketball (2014 and 2018), two in cross country (1982 and 1994 in class AA), two in golf (1969 and 1984), and one in track and field (2009 in class AA).

Controversy

January 2019 Lincoln Memorial incident 

Covington Catholic sends students to the March for Life each year; nearly half of the student body attended in 2015.
On January 18, 2019, the school attracted attention when videos showed Nathan Phillips, a Native American who was participating in an Indigenous Peoples March in Washington, D.C., approaching a group of their students while beating on a drum. The students were visiting the Lincoln Memorial after participating in the Washington March for Life.  The students were initially widely condemned on the basis of a short video and reported accounts from Phillips. Later, longer videos giving the incident more context fueled controversy and discussion on what had actually occurred. Several media sources issued retractions, corrections, and apologies.

The school and the Roman Catholic Diocese of Covington initially apologized to Phillips and said that they would further investigate the matter. Bishop Roger Joseph Foys subsequently apologized to the students involved, saying, "We should not have allowed ourselves to be bullied and pressured into making a statement prematurely."

An investigation into the event conducted by Greater Cincinnati Investigation, Inc. found that although gestures, like the “tomahawk chop” were made, no "offensive or racial statements" were made by the Covington Catholic students.
Following the Washington D.C. incident, the students involved were not punished. However, following the incident, changes were made within the school to better protect the students attending after numerous bomb and gun threats.

Notable alumni 

 Frank Busch (1969), Olympic swimming coach
 Pat Cipollone (1984), White House Counsel
 Brett Dietz, Arena Football League player
 Nate Dusing (1997), Olympic swimmer
 Steve Flesch (1985), PGA Tour golfer
 Chris Harris, professional wrestler
 Adam Koenig (1989), Kentucky Republican state representative
 Luke Maile (2009), MLB player
 Michael Mayer, American football player at Notre Dame
 Don McNay (1977), financial author
 Mike Mitchell, NFL player (studied at the school before transferring)
 Bob Naber (1948), NBA player
 Dan Neville (1959), MLB player
 Dan Tieman (1958), NBA player
 Paul Walther, NBA player

References

External links 
 
 Breaking down the full video with Covington Catholic students, The Cincinnati Enquirer, January 22, 2019.

Catholic secondary schools in Kentucky
Roman Catholic Diocese of Covington
U.S. Route 42
Schools in Kenton County, Kentucky
Boys' schools in Kentucky
Educational institutions established in 1925
1925 establishments in Kentucky